Elemental Productions is an independent documentary film production company whose mission statement is to produce films exploring issues on culture, mental health and personal experience in Indonesia and around the world. The company was founded in 2008 by cultural anthropologist and filmmaker, Robert Lemelson, and is based in Los Angeles, California.

Filmography

References

External links
 Elemental Productions (Official Website)
 40 Years of Silence: An Indonesian Tragedy (Official Website)
 Afflictions: Culture & Mental Illness in Indonesia Film Series (Official Website)
 Jathilan: Trance and Possession in Java (Official Website)
 Documentary Educational Resources (Educational Distributor's Website)
 Robert Lemelson (IMDB)

Film production companies of the United States